The 1947 Campeonato Nacional de Fútbol Profesional was Chilean first tier’s 15th season. Colo-Colo was the tournament’s champion, winning its fifth title.

Scores

Standings

Topscorer

References

External links
ANFP 
RSSSF Chile 1947

Primera División de Chile seasons
Primera
Chile